Kallachirippu is a 2018 Indian Tamil language thriller web television series. It has a non-linear narrative structure provided and is hosted by Zee5, a video on demand platform. The web series was directed by Rohit Nandakumar and produced by popular film director Karthik Subbaraj under his own production company Stone Bench Productions. This was Karthik Subbaraj's first web series as a producer and it was the first web series for Stone Bench Productions company. The web series was released on the streaming platform Zee5 on 23 July 2018 and eventually ended up on 30 July 2018 with only 8 episodes. It starred Amrutha Srinivasan in the female lead role while Vikas, Vignesh Shanmugam, Rajalakshmi, Uma, Maheshwaran and Nandakumar played pivotal roles. This web series is also the second web series to be launched by Zee5 network after America Mappillai. The web series received positive reviews from critics and audience for portrayal of women in more prominent identical roles than the male counterparts. The theme of series consists of lust, sexuality, pornography, LGBT, abortion and extramarital affairs apart from love and arranged marriage.

Plot 
The series follows 24 year old Mahati through a series of misadventures that begin after being forced into an arranged marriage. Then the newly married Mahati accidentally stabs her husband to death in self-defense after a heated argument. She then promptly wipes her blood-spattered face and calls her boyfriend to clean up the mess. This sets off a chain of events that the true nature of every character involved in this marriage. The series also involved a love story between gay couple.

Cast 
 Amrutha Srinivasan as Mahati
Rohit Nandakumar as Indrajith
 Vikas as Ram
 Vignesh Shanmugam as Ram's boyfriend
 Rajalakshmi
 Uma
 Maheshwaran
 Nandakumar
 Chennu Mohan

Episodes

Production 
The idea of producing a web series between Rohit Nandakumar and Karthik Subbaraj was revealed after the release of the anthology film Aviyal in which both of the artists worked for the film together. Nandakumar wrote and acted in one of the six short stories which combined to build up the Tamil anthology film Aviyal while Karthik Subbaraj produced the film under his own production banner Stone Bench Productions. Nandakumar was approached by Subbaraj to make a web series just after the release of Aviyal. Subbaraj approached him as he liked the work of Nandakumar and hinted him to direct a feature film before transforming the concept to make a web series.

Reception 
The Indian Express stated that the series is a hard one to review. The story and dialogues are well-written. The conversations between the characters define their relationship and perfectly displays the generation they belong to. The series has a lot of swearing around, so much so that they even have a soundtrack for the same. Nonetheless, the story is good enough to hold the viewers attention.

The News Minute critically reviewed by saying that kallachirippu lacked genuine entertainment. The screenplay is complex, layered and quite unpredictable. Every episode ends with a cliff-hanger, each one subtler than the last, and perhaps, less effective. The lines for the story were well-written, but falls short on the performances of the actors in delivering them.

The Times of India praised the series for its thriller storyline. All the characters in the webseries act of out passion ansd anger. The show shines the best through dialogues, the way the characters communicate to each other seemed very natural. Each episode of kallachirippu unvails a secret which is quite interesting. Also, the suspense of the murder was carried well towards the end of the series.

References

External links 
 Kallachirippu on ZEE5

ZEE5 original programming
Tamil-language web series
Tamil-language action television series
2018 Tamil-language television series debuts
Tamil-language thriller television series
Tamil-language television shows
2018 Tamil-language television series endings
Nonlinear narrative television series